David Pel (born 9 July 1991) is a Dutch tennis player.

He has a career high ATP singles ranking of World No. 885 achieved on 1 May 2017. He also has a career high ATP doubles ranking of World No. 76 achieved on 19 July 2021. Pel has won one doubles ATP title with Sander Arends.
Pel has also reached 51 ITF career doubles finals consisting of 23 wins and 28 losses with a 12–16 record in ATP Challenger finals.

Career
Pel made his ATP main draw debut at the 2017 Ricoh Open in the doubles draw partnering Tallon Griekspoor. He was defeated by Santiago González and Adil Shamasdin in the first round. Pel was trained from 2014 to 2021 by Dennis van Scheppingen.

ATP career finals

Doubles: 2 (1 title, 1 runner-up)

Challenger and Futures finals

Doubles: 55 (27–28)

References

External links
 
 

1991 births
Living people
Dutch male tennis players
Sportspeople from Amstelveen
People from Aalsmeer
20th-century Dutch people
21st-century Dutch people